CCGS Des Groseilliers is a  in the Canadian Coast Guard. The vessel is named after Médard Chouart des Groseilliers (1618–1669) a close associate of Pierre-Esprit Radisson in explorations west of the Great Lakes and the founding of the British Hudson's Bay Company. The ship entered service in 1982. The vessel has participated in a number of research voyages, including Ice Station SHEBA. As part of the Surface Heat Budget of the Arctic Ocean experiment conducted in the Arctic Ocean from October 1997 to October 1998 to provide polar input to global climate models, Des Groseilliers was allowed to be frozen into the ice for the Arctic winter, to serve as a base for scientific researchers.

Design and description
The Pierre Radisson class were designed for Coast Guard operations in the Arctic Ocean.

The vessel is propelled by two fixed-pitch propellers and one bow thruster powered by a diesel-electric system comprising six Alco M251F diesel engines that when driving the shafts create  and six GEC generators creating 11.1 megawatts sustained, powering two motors that when driving the shafts create . The vessel is also equipped with one Caterpillar 398 emergency generator.

Des Groseilliers is equipped with a Sperry navigational radar operating on the E/F and I bands. The icebreaker has a  flight deck and a  hangar which originally accommodated one light helicopter of the MBB Bo 105 or Bell 206L types, but currently accommodates the Bell 429 GlobalRanger and Bell 412EPI which were acquired by the Canadian Coast Guard in the 2010s to replace the older helicopters. The ship can carry  of aviation fuel for the helicopters. The vessel is certified as Arctic Class 3 and has a complement of 35 with 10 officers and 25 crew and 40 additional berths.

Operational history
The third vessel in the class, Des Groseilliers was ordered in December 1979 as part of the Canadian government's efforts to stimulate shipbuilding in Canada. The ship was constructed by Port Weller Dry Docks at their shipyard in Port Weller, Ontario with the yard number 68 and was launched on 20 February 1982. The vessel was commissioned in August 1982 and completed in October. The ship replaced the aging icebreaker  in the Laurentian Region. The vessel is registered in Ottawa, Ontario and homeported at Quebec City, Quebec. During the winter, Des Groseilliers is assigned to icebreaking and ship escort operations in the Gulf of St. Lawrence and on the St. Lawrence and Saguenay Rivers and supports icebreaking operations in the Saint Lawrence Seaway and Great Lakes. During the summer the icebreaker sails to the Canadian Arctic to escort commercial vessels, maintain navigation aids in the region, search and rescue, and support scientific missions.

In 1983, Des Groseilliers made her first voyage to the Arctic. In April 1984, after the opening of the navigation season on the Saint Lawrence Seaway and the Great Lakes, the area froze up, driving six cargo ships ashore and a further eighteen became stuck in the ice. Five icebreakers were assigned to aid the merchant vessels, however, they proved unable to meet the task. The following year, the icebreaker escorted the icebreaking cargo ship  to Cameron Island in the Arctic to load 100,000 barrels of oil. 

As part of the Surface Heat Budget of the Arctic Ocean experiment in 1997,  and Des Groseilliers sailed through the Northwest Passage to meet  in Alaskan waters. Sir Wilfrid Laurier then escorted Des Groseilliers to a point where Des Groseillierss engines were shut off on 2 October and the ship was left with a minimum crew and a group of international scientists. The vessel was then left to drift in the pack ice for a year and dubbed Ice Station SHEBA. Landing strips were constructed on the ice and throughout the winter the vessel was visited by Twin Otter aircraft bringing equipment and replacement personnel and scientists. In Spring 1998, the ice that enclosed the ship began to crack and the landing strips could no longer be used. The icebreaker had been expected to drift in circles, however, the vessel drifted towards Russian waters. Louis S. St-Laurent returned on 9 October 1998 with additional crew and the two vessels sailed south, with Des Groseilliers returning to Quebec City on 4 November.

In spring 2008, Des Groseilliers collided with the Sea Shepherd Conservation Society vessel, in the Gulf of Saint Lawrence, during the annual seal hunt. Paul Watson, head of the society, claimed that the icebreaker had rammed the society's research vessel. However, a spokesman for the department of Fisheries and Oceans Canada claimed that the research vessel "grazed" the icebreaker.

References

Notes

Citations

Sources

External links

 CCGS Des Groseilliers

Pierre Radisson-class icebreakers
1982 ships
Ships built in Ontario